Tybee Island Range Front Lighthouse, also known as Tybee (Knoll) Cut Range Front Lighthouse, was a lighthouse in Georgia, United States, at the mouth of the Savannah River, near Tybee Island, Georgia.

This lighthouse should not be confused with more well-known Tybee Island Light Station.

History
Tybee Island Range Front Lighthouse was built in 1878 and had a sixth-order Fresnel lens.

See also
 Tybee Island Light Station

Lighthouses completed in 1878
Lighthouses in Georgia (U.S. state)
Buildings and structures in Chatham County, Georgia
1878 establishments in Georgia (U.S. state)